The Utah Education Association (UEA) is the largest public education employees' union in the U.S. state of Utah, representing more than 18,000 teachers. It has local affiliates in 41 school districts, Applied Technology Colleges, and the Utah Schools for the Deaf and the Blind in Ogden. It is the state affiliate of the National Education Association.

History 

UEA was organized in 1860 as “The Deseret School Teachers’ Association,” “for the purpose of establishing a society for promoting the educational interests of the community.” In 1910 it was incorporated as the "Utah Educational Association," and by 1924 had adopted the current name and restricted its membership to professional educators.

In May 1964, at the climax of a battle with Utah governor George Dewey Clyde, the UEA led a two-day walkout - the first statewide teacher's strike in the nation.
From 1990 to 1996, the president of the UEA was Lily Eskelsen.  She is now the president of the NEA.
In 2007, UEA, working within a coalition called Utahns for Public Schools, led a successful bid to repeal what would have been the nation's first statewide universal private-school voucher.

Convention 

For over 100 years the UEA's annual convention was its largest and most high-profile event, featuring national speakers and workshops on best teaching practices. It also attracted political candidates, and included an awards banquet highlighting excellence in teaching. Most of Utah's school districts take their fall break on or just before the annual deer hunt, and UEA usually scheduled its convention to coincide with this break, so that teachers could attend without taking days off or hiring substitutes. Eventually the schools came to refer to the fall break as "UEA Weekend," until a state law passed in 2007 barred them from doing so, to avoid favoring or endorsing one employee association over another.

In 2018 the UEA ended its annual convention after dwindling attendance, and to give teachers a break from the demands of the classroom.

Notes

References
 Moffitt, John Clifton. A Century of Service, 1860-1960: A History of the Utah Education Association. Salt Lake City: Utah Education Association, 1960.
 
 Utah Education Association Addendum, (1949-1990), in the Utah State University Library.
 "UEA leaders seek more spending per pupil as investment in future," Deseret News, 10/1/2009.
 "Underfunded schools reach their breaking point," Salt Lake Tribune, 10/2/2009.

External links
 

1910 establishments in Utah
Education trade unions
National Education Association
Politics of Utah
Teacher associations based in the United States
Trade unions in the United States
State wide trade unions in the United States
Trade unions established in 1910
Educational organizations based in Utah
Murray, Utah